Jannis Bäcker (born 1 January 1985) is a German bobsledder who won a world title in the doubles in 2013, together with Francesco Friedrich. He competed at the 2014 Winter Olympics in the doubles and fours and finished in eighth and tenth place, respectively.

References

1985 births
Living people
German male bobsledders
Bobsledders at the 2014 Winter Olympics
Olympic bobsledders of Germany
People from Unna
Sportspeople from Arnsberg (region)
21st-century German people